Edward Willis may refer to:
 Edward Banker Willis (1831–1879), United States military officer during the American Civil War
 Edward Willis (politician) (1835–1891), journalist and political figure in New Brunswick
 Edward Willis (British Army officer) (1870–1961), British Army officer and Lieutenant Governor of Jersey
 Ted Willis, Baron Willis (Edward Henry Willis, 1914–1992), British television dramatist